Boleh Dan (also Romanized as Boleh Dān) is a village in Khafri Rural District, in the Central District of Sepidan County, Fars Province, Iran. At the 2006 census, its population was 33, in 11 families.

References 

Populated places in Sepidan County